The Man Who Lost His Head is a children's picture book written by Claire Huchet Bishop and illustrated by Robert McCloskey published in 1942.

Plot
The alarm clock rings as the headless man gets out of bed. He searches for the head anywhere and sits down and tries to remember that he lost his head. The headless man takes off his pajamas and gets dressed and can't go out as a headless fellow. He puts on his tuxedo and takes his hat goes to the vegetable garden and takes a pumpkin and carves holes in it and makes a face. The village people see the man with a pumpkin head. He goes back to the vegetable garden, removes a pumpkin head, and takes a parsnip and carves holes in it and makes a face. The village people see the man with a parsnip head. He goes to the woodshed and takes a log and carves a wooden head and makes a face while he sandpapers and polishes it. He removes the parsnip head and puts on the wooden head. This is the perfect head made of wood for a man. He goes to the fair for a perfect head. He wins the cup and goes on the merry-go-round. He sees the wild animals and touches the tiger. The tiger roars at the man with a wooden head. The man meets a boy at the fair and tells him his woes, and the boy solves the mystery of the man's missing head.

Versions
The man with his head in the clouds walking with a pig and cat
The headless man walking with a magnifying glass to the fair

1942 children's books
Books by Robert McCloskey
Picture books by Claire Huchet Bishop
American picture books
Children's fiction books